The Kition Resheph pillars are two Phoenician inscriptions discovered in Cyprus at Kition in 1860. They are notable for mentioning three cities - Kition, Idalion and Tamassos.

They currently reside in the Louvre: AO 7090 (CIS I 10) and AO 4826 (CIS I 88).

The reference to Kition in the inscriptions was compared to a bilingual reference to the city in one of the earliest known Athenian Greek-Phoenician inscriptions (see here for image).

AO 7090 (CIS I 10)

Four line Phoenician inscription on a marble block, found in autumn 1861 in Kition (today, part of Larnaca), and obtained by Demetrios Pierides. The inscription mentions its date as year 21 of Pymiaton, the last king of Kition, i.e. in 336/7. The inscription is dedicated to Canaanite god Resheph. The inscription is as follows:

 On the sixteenth day of the month of Bul, the year 21 of the reign of Pumayyaton, king of Citium, 
 Idalion and Temessus, son of king Milkyaton, king of Citium and Idalion. This altar 
 and two altar hearths are what was offered by bd', the priest of Resheph-of-the-arrow (ršp ḥṣ), the son of Yakon-
 shalom, of the son of Eshmunadon, to his lord Resheph-of-the-arrow. May he bless (him)!

AO 4826 (CIS I 88)

Seven line Phoenician inscription on a marble block, thought to have served as the base for a statue, as the upper face includes the holes which may have held the clamps for the feet of a statue.

The provenance is unknown, and has been variously given as Idalion and Kition. It was found in 1860 in its secondary use in a mosque in Nicosia (20km north of ancient Idalion), however Melchior de Vogüé wrote that "it had been brought from Larnaca" (where ancient Kition is located).

The inscription mentions its date as year 6 of the reign of Milkyaton, king of Citium and Idalium, which is the year 387. The inscription is as follows:

 On the sixth day of the month of Pa..., the year 3 of the reign of Milkyaton, king of Citium and
 Idalion, son of Baalrom. This is the statue offered and erected 'and' (by) [… Rashap-]
 -yaton son of Izratiba'al, the royal interpreter, to his lord Melqart, (since) he he[ard (his) voice]… 
 Fulfilled this vow and fulfilled the intentions expressed in this vow by [… son of Rashap-yaton]
 the royal interpreter… commissioned... and ... statues on the steps... commissioned...
 Abd-Pummay and Abd-Melqart, two sons of Adoni-shemesh, of the son of Rashap-yaton, the [ro]yal interpreter, in the year 6 
 of the reign of Milkyaton, king of Citium and Idalion, since Melqart heard their voice. May he bless them.

It was discovered by Crusader historian Emmanuel Guillaume-Rey in Nicosia, where it had been brought from Larnaca and served as a mount at the door of the qadi. Guillaume-Rey had deposited at the French consulate, who sent it to the Louvre.

Bibliography

Notes

1860 archaeological discoveries
Phoenician inscriptions
Archaeological artifacts
Phoenician steles